West Kootenay North was an electoral district in the Canadian province of British Columbia in the 1894 election only.  Its official name was "West Kootenay (north riding).  It was formed from a partition the West Kootenay riding that also created West Kootenay (south riding).

Demographics

Geography

History

Notable MLAs

Election results 
Note:  Winners of each election are in bold.

|-

|- bgcolor="white"
!align="right" colspan=3|Total valid votes
!align="right"|342
!align="right"|100.00%
!align="right"|
|- bgcolor="white"
!align="right" colspan=3|Total rejected ballots
!align="right"|
!align="right"|
!align="right"|
|- bgcolor="white"
!align="right" colspan=3|Turnout
!align="right"|55.37%
!align="right"|
!align="right"|
|}
  	  	
In the 1898 election the West Kootenay region was further redistributed into:

West Kootenay-Nelson, used 1898-1900 only
Nelson City, 1903–1912
Nelson
West Kootenay-Revelstoke, used 1900 only
Revelstoke, 1903–1963
West Kootenay-Rossland, used 1898-1900 only
Rossland City 1903-1912
Rossland 1916-1920
West Kootenay-Slocan, used 1898-1900 only
Kaslo, 1903–1920
Slocan, 1903–1920
Kaslo-Slocan, 1924–1963

Former provincial electoral districts of British Columbia